The 2016–17 Primera División Femenina de Fútbol, also known as Liga Iberdrola for sponsorship reasons, was the 29th edition of Spain's highest women's football league. Athletic Club were the defending champions. The competition started on 3 September 2016.

Team changes
Betis and Tacuense will make their debut in the top league after achieving promotion in the previous season.

The two promoted clubs replaced Oviedo Moderno and Collerense, relegated to Segunda División.

Teams

Stadia and locations

Personnel and sponsorship

Managerial changes

Overview
On 20 May 2017, Atlético de Madrid achieved the title after beating Real Sociedad in the last round by 2–1. The Colchoneras ended the season without losses.

One week before, newcomer team Tacuense was relegated to Segunda División. The league ended with the relegation of Basque Oiartzun two seasons after their last promotion.

League table

Results

Season statistics
As of Week 30

Top scorers

Hat-tricks

4 Player scored 4 goals
6 Player scored 6 goals

Best goalkeepers

Player of the week

All-season Team
Source: All-star team is a squad consisting of the eleven most impressive players as supporters

Notable attendances

Transfers

Source: La Liga

References

External links
Primera División (women) at La Liga 
RFEF Official Website 

2016-17
Spa
1
women's